The Saint Augustine Parish Church, commonly known as Bantay Church, is a Roman Catholic church in Bantay, Ilocos Sur in the Philippines. The church was dedicated to Saint Augustine of Hippo. It houses the venerated image of Our Lady of Charity. 

Pope Pius XII issued a pontifical decree of coronation titled “Quas Tuas” on 3 August 1955 towards the venerated image of Our Lady of Chairty, being granted to the Archbishop of Nueva Segovia, Santiago Caragnan y Sancho. The decree was signed by the Secretary Deacon Giulio Rossi and notarized by the Grand Chancellor, Girolamo Ricci. The coronation was carried out 12 January 1956 by the Apostolic Nuncio, Cardinal Egidio Vagnozzi and named as “Patroness of Ilocandia”. 

The old historic belfry of the church known as the Bantay Tower, which served as a watchtower for pirates back in the Spanish colonial era, gave the town its name - bantay (meaning to guard).  Established in 1590, the church is one of the oldest in the Ilocos Region.

Architecture 
The church was heavily damaged during World War II and rebuilding was started in 1950. The restored façade is of Neo-Gothic design mixed with pseudo-Romanesque materials and elements. It is designed to be grandiose and reminiscent of Spanish architecture. It uses materials such as bricks and mud.

The belfry sits on a hilltop overlooking a green pasture and the province of Abra. It was used as a watchtower for invading enemy forces during World War II because of its strategic location. The Bantay Church and bell tower are monumental witnesses to various atrocities and uprisings.

Earthquake (2022)
On 27 July  2022, parts of the Bantay Bell Tower crumbled after a 7.0 magnitude earthquake struck the province of Abra and nearby provinces.

References

External links

Roman Catholic churches in Ilocos Sur
1590 establishments in the Philippines
Churches in the Roman Catholic Archdiocese of Nueva Segovia